A  salt shaker is a container for salt. Salt shaker or saltshaker may also refer to:
 "Salt Shaker" (song), the Ying Yang Twins song
 The Saltshaker Project, an initiative of Greening Australia